Harry Hallenberger (October 24, 1877 – March 4, 1954) was an American cinematographer who was nominated at the 14th Academy Awards for Best Cinematography-Color, along with Ray Rennahan. This was for the film Louisiana Purchase.

Filmography as cinematographer
(He also was a camera operator on other films.)

Feature-length films

Pirates of Monterey (1947)
The Virginian (1946)
Riding High (1943)
Louisiana Purchase (1941)
Arizona (1940)
Night Work (1939)
El Trovador de la radio (1938)
Forlorn River (1937)
Redskin (1929) (uncredited)
Special Delivery (1927)
In Hollywood with Potash and Perlmutter (1924)
Peck's Bad Boy (1921)

Shorts

College Queen (1946) 
Movieland Magic (1946)
Golden Slippers (1946) 
A Tale of Two Cafes (1946) 
Boogie Woogie (1945)
Isle of Tabu (1945)
You Hit the Spot (1945)
Bonnie Lassie (1944)
Star Bright (1944)
Mardi Gras (1943)
Women at War (1943)

References

External links

1877 births
1954 deaths
American cinematographers
People from Illinois